Marcos Martos may refer to:

 Marco Martos (American football) (born 1973), Mexican American football player
 Marco Martos Carrera, Peruvian poet